Andy Freed (born 1971 in Ellicott City, Maryland) is a radio announcer for the Tampa Bay Rays baseball team. He and fellow broadcaster Dave Wills shared play-by-play and color commentating duties for the Rays from 2005 until Wills' death in 2023, often alternating roles for several innings at a time during ballgames. 

In 2016, Freed signed a contract extension with the Tampa Bay Rays Radio Network which will keep him with the team until at least the 2019 season. During baseball's offseason, Freed has done college basketball broadcasts for ESPN Regional.

Freed's radio career has featured work with the Pawtucket Red Sox, the Trenton Thunder, and the St. Lucie Mets in minor league baseball. He also did radio broadcasts for Providence College basketball, Rider University basketball, College of New Jersey football, and Baltimore Spirit soccer. Freed started his broadcast career while still a student at his alma mater, Towson State University, when he covered various sporting events for the university's radio station, WTMD.

Personal life
Andy Freed grew up outside of Baltimore, Maryland as a Baltimore Orioles fan. In 1992, he met longtime Orioles and ESPN broadcaster Jon Miller, who became a mentor for Freed when he was getting started in the business. Freed and his wife Amy have three children named Sarah, Casey, and Madeline. They also have a dog named Charlie Brown.

References

External links
 Official bio at raysbaseball.com

1971 births
Living people
American radio sports announcers
Association football commentators
College basketball announcers in the United States
College football announcers
Major League Baseball broadcasters
Minor League Baseball broadcasters
Place of birth missing (living people)
Tampa Bay Rays announcers
Towson University alumni